Hammerlock is a form of the armlock in wrestling and martial arts. It may also refer to one of the following:

Hammerlock (dance), a type of dance handhold
Hammerlock (film), a 2000 comedy film
Hammerlock (band), a rock band
Hammerlock (coupling link), the method for locking a CM Hammerlok Coupling Link for connecting chain.

See also
 Hammerlocke, a DC Comics science fiction limited series